Sergey Alekseyevich Khristianovich (9 November 1908 – 28 April 2000) was a mechanics scientist from the Soviet Union. Academician of AS USSR since 1943 (corresponding member since 1939), Hero of Soc. Labour (1969).

Sergey Khristianovich graduated from Leningrad State University in 1930.  He has made a huge contribution into development of mechanics in Russia and is well known for his studies in aerodynamics.

Khristianovich was one of the organizers of the Siberian Branch of the Russian Academy of Sciences (SBRAS), one of the organizers of Moscow Institute of Physics and Technology, and a co-founder of Novosibirsk State University.

He was dismissed from (SBRAS) in 2003.

References

Further reading

 
 

1908 births
2000 deaths
Soviet scientists
Russian physicists
Academic staff of Novosibirsk State University
Full Members of the Russian Academy of Sciences
Burials in Troyekurovskoye Cemetery
Central Aerohydrodynamic Institute employees
Full Members of the USSR Academy of Sciences